Vilhelm Nikolaus August Hagborg (26 May 1852, Gothenburg – 30 April 1921, Paris) was a Swedish painter who spent most of his life in France.

Biography
His father was an associate professor. Against the wishes of his parents, he decided on a career in art and, from 1872 to 1874, he studied at the Royal Swedish Academy of Fine Arts in Stockholm with Vicente Palmaroli. In 1875, he went to Paris to complete his training, but ended by spending most of his life there. Initially, he focused on genre scenes and imagined historical scenes from 18th century France. Some of them were sent home and one was purchased by King Oscar II.

When he began painting in Normandy and Brittany, he discovered some of the motifs that would come to dominate his work, such as beaches, fishermen and their families. "Low Tide in the English Channel" was exhibited at the Salon in 1879 and was purchased by the Luxembourg Museum. The publicity from that sale ensured his career. He became part of a circle of Swedish painters that included Prince Eugen, a gifted amateur artist.

He was a regular exhibitor at the Salon from 1876 to 1909. In 1878, he represented Sweden at the Exposition Universelle with a large portrait of a fisherman carrying his daughter in his arms. At the Salon of 1880, he was presented with a bust of himself by the Swedish sculptor, Ingel Fallstedt. He was later named a member of the Société nationale des beaux-arts. In 1885, he supported a group known as the "Opponenterna" that was protesting what they felt were the archaic methods employed by the Royal Academy. That same year, he married Gerda Christina Göthberg (1863–1934) in Stockholm. He had a successful showing at the Exposition Universelle in 1889.
 
During summer visits to Sweden, he painted in Skåne and Dalarö. In 1909, he reversed his pattern; making his home in Sweden and visiting Paris. After 1914, he came to favor Dalarna for his painting and his works became more abstract. Upon his death, his body was returned to Sweden and buried at the Norra begravningsplatsen.

His works may be seen at the Nationalmuseum and the Göteborgs konstmuseum

His brother was the painter and professional diver, Otto Hagborg.

References

External links

 Biography from the Svenskt Biografiskt Lexikon
 More works by Hagborg @ ArtNet

19th-century Swedish painters
Swedish male painters
20th-century Swedish painters
1852 births
1921 deaths
19th-century Swedish male artists
20th-century Swedish male artists